Diogenes (Greek: Διογένης; died c. 129) was the bishop of Byzantium for approximately fifteen years (114–129 AD). He succeeded Bishop Sedecion. He was in office during the rule of Trajan and Hadrian. Very little is known of him

References 

2nd-century Romans
2nd-century Byzantine bishops
Bishops of Byzantium